Slint was an American rock band from Louisville, Kentucky, formed in 1986. The band consisted of Brian McMahan (guitar, vocals), David Pajo (guitar), Britt Walford (drums, vocals), Todd Brashear (bassist on Spiderland), and Ethan Buckler (bassist on Tweez). Slint's first album, Tweez, was recorded by engineer Steve Albini in 1987 and released in obscurity on the Jennifer Hartman Records label in 1989. It was followed two years later by the critically acclaimed Spiderland, released on the independent label Touch and Go Records.

They have reunited sporadically since 1990.

History

Pre-Slint
Walford and McMahan met in their pre-teens and attended the Brown School, a Louisville public school founded on a pedagogy of self-directed learning. They began performing music together at an early age, forming the Languid and Flaccid with Ned Oldham (later of The Anomoanon) while still in middle school. In their teens Walford and McMahan played together in the seminal Louisville punk band Squirrel Bait. Walford left the band following their first recording session while McMahan went on to tour and record Squirrel Bait's two albums before the band's dissolution in 1987.

Pajo and Walford (and, briefly, McMahan) were in the punk/prog-metal band Maurice with future members of Kinghorse. After being influenced by the music of the Minutemen, Pajo and Walford's musical direction became too obtuse for the other members of Maurice, who parted ways. Maurice's later material would form the basis of some of Slint's early compositions.

1986–1989: Founding, Recording of Tweez, and Ethan Buckler's departure 
Slint formed in the summer of 1986. Walford and Pajo were joined by the slightly older Buckler (age 18 at the time) for a show for a Unitarian Universalist congregation on November 2; performing under the name Small Tight Dirty Tufts of Hair, most of the congregation left during the band's first two songs. They were soon joined by McMahan and named themselves Slint after one of Walford's pet fish.

Slint's first album, Tweez, was recorded in the fall of 1987 by Steve Albini, whom the band had chosen because they were fans of Albini's recently defunct group Big Black. Though Slint's members had composed the album's music during rehearsals in Walford's parents' basement, most of the lyrics were created in-studio, and included between-song sound effects and ad-libbed conversations with Albini. During mixdown, Walford requested that Albini "make the bass drum sound like a ham being slapped by a catcher's mitt," and then spilled a cup of tea on Albini's mixing board. Without formal song titles, eight of the album's tracks were named for the band members' parents, and a ninth for Walford's dog, Rhoda. Once completed, Buckler was dissatisfied with the recordings and left Slint to form the group King Kong, initially made up of all of Slint's members taking up different instruments. All of Slint's original members recorded the single "Movie Star" as King Kong in Steve Albini's studio while he was away on a trip in 1989.

1988–1991: Todd Brashear joins, release of Tweez, 12" Single, Spiderland, and dissolution 

Buckler was soon replaced by bass player Todd Brashear. Slint had hoped that Touch and Go Records would release Tweez, but the band did not hear back from the label. A friend of the group, Jennifer Hartman, paid for the album's release for a tiny run on the imprint Jennifer Hartman Records in 1989. By then the group had returned to the studio with Albini to record two instrumental tracks. Original copies of Tweez included a flyer advertising a 12" single of these songs to be released on Jennifer Hartman. But by now, the band had succeeded in catching the ear of Touch & Go Records's founder Corey Rusk who agreed to release the group's next album. The master tapes to the proposed 12" were then shelved, making Tweez the sole release on the Jennifer Hartman label.

By the time Tweez was released, most of the group had gone off to college and would return to Louisville during breaks to write and practice new material. Returning to the Walfords' basement, the group would spend hours repeating the same guitar riff and then adding in layers of nuance on top of it. After rehearsals, McMahan took practice tapes home and worked on vocals with the use of a 4-track tape recorder. Sitting in his parents' car made it possible to record softly spoken vocals over the band's loud music. After developing these new songs, Slint's members wanted a cleaner sound than that of their first LP, so they approached Minneapolis producer Brian Paulson who had recorded two albums with McMahan's former bandmates' group Bastro. On a trip to visit Bastro and Paulson during the recording sessions for their final studio album, Sing the Troubled Beast, McMahan was in a near-fatal car accident. While in the ambulance, a paramedic called in "Code 138" and the immobilized McMahan regained consciousness singing the Misfits song "We are 138." McMahan's brush with death left the young musician feeling depressed, a condition that would affect the recording and aftermath of Slint's next album.

Paulson and Slint met over a weekend to record Spiderland in Chicago. All of the music was recorded live, with vocals overdubbed afterward in no more than two takes and with little to no rehearsal on the part of McMahan. The group used two different microphones to record vocals: one for softer, spoken voices, and one for louder, sung voices. During mixdown, Paulson and the group would try adding different effects, but all these were rejected, resulting in a very pared-down production sound. The day after Spiderlands recording session ended, McMahan checked himself into a mental hospital where he was diagnosed with depression, and subsequently left the band.

Longtime friend of the band Will Oldham took numerous photos of the group as potential album covers. Some of these were taken in a nearby quarry and one was chosen with Slint's four members' heads bobbing above the surface of the water. Touch and Go released Spiderland in 1991. The album was unlike anything else that the label had released to date. Slint was to have gone on a European tour after its release, but with the band no longer together, there were no tours, interviews, photo or video shoots to promote the album. Despite this, the album's repute grew and it continued to sell several thousand copies annually in the years following its release, a considerable feat for an indie record by a defunct group and a mystique around the record, and the artists who made it, began to grow.

Spiderland is considered a seminal work, characterized by dark, syncopated rhythms, sparse guitar lines and haunting subject matter. The record's impact was such that many fans and critics consider it a foundational post-rock album, helping to usher in a new wave of bands seeking a move away from the unfettered aggression of hardcore punk but not its underlying ethic.

1992–present: Post-Slint

The band briefly reformed in 1992, and again in 1994. During this time, Touch and Go Records reissued Tweez in 1993, and in 1994 an untitled 10" EP of the two songs from the shelved tapes recorded between their two albums—one a reinterpretation of "Rhoda" from Tweez, and the other a track called "Glenn".

Members of Slint have since appeared in a number of bands.  In 2009, former guitarist David Pajo performed with Yeah Yeah Yeahs as a live back-up musician.  He briefly played in Stereolab, took up bass in Interpol, and performs under the moniker PAJO and occasionally with his band Papa M, also known as Ariel M, or just M.  Pajo has also been a member of Dead Child, Tortoise, Palace, The For Carnation, Household Gods, the short-lived Billy Corgan-fronted rock band Zwan, and as of 2021, Gang of Four. Guitarist Brian McMahan formed The For Carnation in 1994 and also played with Will Oldham in Palace. Britt Walford played drums in Evergreen, and for The Breeders under the pseudonym Shannon Doughton on the album Pod, and as Mike Hunt on the Safari EP.  Ethan Buckler has released several albums with his group King Kong featuring an ever-shifting cast of members who have occasionally included David Pajo.

Reunions
Nearly fifteen years after originally disbanding, three members of Slint—Brian McMahan, David Pajo, and Britt Walford—reunited to curate the 2005 All Tomorrow's Parties (ATP) music festival in Camber Sands, England. Also in 2005, Slint played a number of shows in the U.S. and in Europe.  Though they insisted the reunion was short-term, the band regrouped once again in 2007 to perform Spiderland in its entirety in Barcelona as part of the Primavera Sound Festival, in London as part of the ATP Don't Look Back series of shows, as well as at a handful of dates in Europe, the U.S. (at Chicago's Pitchfork Music Festival, the Showbox in Seattle, and the Henry Fonda Theatre in Hollywood), and Canada.  In addition to performing the album and the EP Slint, they also debuted a new composition called "King's Approach", which remains unrecorded.

In a September 2012 interview conducted with Northern Irish music publication AU Magazine, David Pajo hinted at more activity from the band in the coming months: "We still communicate regularly and we've got some surprises for next year that fans will be excited about. I know I am."

The band reunited in December 2013 to play as one of the headliners of the final All Tomorrow's Parties holiday camp festival in Camber Sands, England.

In an August 2013 interview with Vish Khanna, former producer Steve Albini revealed that the band was working on remastering their second album, Spiderland, with producer Bob Weston. The deluxe Spiderland boxset was announced in January 2014. In 2014 Touch and Go released several live, demo, and practice sessions of songs recorded by the band between 1989 and 1990. These appeared as the LP Bonus Tracks, as well as in box set editions of Spiderland alongside the DVD Breadcrumb Trail, filmmaker Lance Bangs' 90-minute documentary about the band shot over the course of 12 years. In 2014, the band also performed at the Primavera Sound music festival in Spain and Portugal and Green Man Festival in Wales.

The group has no plans to record new material and have since disbanded after their most recent reunions in 2013 and 2014.

Musical style 
The band was noted for having syncopated guitar riffs, drastically altering dynamics, and complex song structures and time signatures. McMahan's and Walford's vocals comprised hushed spoken words, singing, and strained screaming.

Artists that influenced Slint include Leonard Cohen, Neil Young, Nick Cave, Madonna, Philip Glass, Minutemen and Big Black.

Members

Core members 
David Pajo – guitar (1986–1990, 1992, 1994, reunions)
Britt Walford – drums, guitar, vocals (1986–1990, 1992, 1994, reunions)
Ethan Buckler – bass (1986–1987)
Brian McMahan – guitar, vocals (1986–1990, 1992, 1994, reunions)
Todd Brashear – bass (1988–1990, 1992)

Former touring members 
Michael McMahan – guitar (2005, 2007, 2013–2014)
Todd Cook – bass (2005, 2007)
Matt Jencik – bass (2007, 2013–2014)

Session musicians 
 Tim Ruth – bass (1994)

Timeline

Discography

Studio albums
 Tweez (1989)
 Spiderland (1991)

References

External links

 Slint Touch and Go records band page

American post-hardcore musical groups
American post-rock groups
Indie rock musical groups from Kentucky
Math rock groups
Musical groups from Louisville, Kentucky
Musical groups established in 1986
Musical groups reestablished in 2007
Touch and Go Records artists
1986 establishments in Kentucky
Musical groups reestablished in 2013
Musical groups reestablished in 2005